North Thompson River Provincial Park is a provincial park in British Columbia, Canada.

References

Provincial parks of British Columbia
Thompson Country
Protected areas established in 1967
1967 establishments in British Columbia